The 2015 Inter-Provincial Cup was the third edition of the Inter-Provincial Cup, a One Day cricket competition played in Ireland. It was held from 4 May to 30 August 2015. Three teams competed; Leinster Lightning, North West Warriors and Northern Knights, with Leinster Lightning being the defending champions. Leinster Lightning retained their title, after going undefeated in the tournament.

Points table
The following teams competed:

 Champions

Fixtures

1st match

2nd match

3rd match

4th match

5th match

6th match

References

External links
 

Inter
Inter-Provincial Cup seasons